Alan Leslie Osborne (born 7 December 1940) is a former Australian rules footballer who played for St Kilda in the Victorian Football League (VFL) during the early 1960s.

Osborne could play in a variety of positions, from forward, ruckman to back pocket. He spent just two seasons at St Kilda and made nine of his eleven appearances in the 1962 VFL season. A VFA representative in the 1966 Hobart Carnival, Osborne previously played for the league in 1961, 1964 and 1965. He was a premiership player at Dandenong in 1967 where he was charged, but exonerated, of kicking, in the Grand Final.

See also
 1967 VFA Grand Final

References

External links

Alan Osborne's playing statistics from The VFA Project

1940 births
Living people
St Kilda Football Club players
Dandenong Football Club players
Australian rules footballers from Victoria (Australia)